P. S. Sreenivasan (September 1923 – 8 July 1997) was a leader of the Communist Party of India (CPI) and a former minister of Kerala state, He is known as the Father of  Tourism in Modern Kerala.

He was born at Ullala in September 1923 as son of Shri Koppuzha K. Krishnan. He entered politics through student movements and the State Congress, joining the CPI in 1943. During the period of C. P. Ramaswamy's government he was imprisoned for 16 months, later followed by a further three years of imprisonment. Despite this he played an important role in the growth of CPI in Kerala.

He was elected to Kerala Assembly in 1960, 1967 and 1970 from Vaikom constituency as a CPI candidate. In 1977 he was elected from Aroor, and in 1980 from Cherthalai. Again, he was elected in 1987 and 1991 from Karunagappally constituency.
Smt. Bharathy is his wife and they have one son.

He served as the Minister for Transport and Electricity, from October 1970 to September 1971, in the Ministry headed by C. Achutha Menon, and as the Minister for Industries and Forests, from November 1978 to October 1979, in the Ministry headed by P. K. Vasudevan Nair. From January 1980 to October 1981 he was the Minister for Revenue and Fisheries; and from March 1987 to June 1991, he was the Minister for Revenue and Tourism, in the Ministries headed by E.K. Nayanar. He is known as father of Tourism movement in modern Kerala

Besides being a member of the Kerala State Council Executive for the CPI, for which he served as treasurer, he was also Leader of the CPI Parliamentary Party and National council member.

He served as president of several community bodies, including the Kerala Karshaka Thozhilali Federation, Kerala Coir Thozhilali Federation, Kerala Hospital Employees Association and Kerala Transport Employees Union. He also served as for two terms as a Senate member of Kerala University.

P.S. Sreenivasan died on 8 July 1997. The Kerala Assembly paid its homage to him on 14 July 1997.

References
1. <https://web.archive.org/web/20111007143214/http://www.stateofkerala.in/niyamasabha/p%20s%20sreenivasan.php> .

2. <http://www.spiderkerala.com/kerala/information/assembly/Developments.aspx/>

3. <https://web.archive.org/web/20120930125407/http://www.niyamasabha.org/codes/members/m652.htm>

1923 births
1997 deaths
Communist Party of India politicians from Kerala
People from Kottayam district
Kerala MLAs 1960–1964
Kerala MLAs 1967–1970
Kerala MLAs 1991–1996